Ci Henglong (born 3 May 2000) is a Chinese footballer currently playing as a goalkeeper for Changchun Yatai.

Career statistics

Club
.

References

2000 births
Living people
Chinese footballers
Association football goalkeepers
Chinese Super League players
Beijing Renhe F.C. players
Heilongjiang Ice City F.C. players
Changchun Yatai F.C. players